Nickelodeon Records (formerly only known as Nick Records from 2001 to 2010) is the record label for the children's television channel Nickelodeon, which is owned by Paramount Global. The label featured new and emerging young musical artists, "triple threat" singers who would also act and dance on the network's series (singer Ariana Grande being one of them), and soundtrack compilations based on Nickelodeon TV shows.

Nickelodeon released its first soundtrack album in 1993. The "Nick Records" name was first used in 2001, when Nickelodeon announced a partnership with Jive Records to form a new record label. In September 2004, Nick Records announced a new partner, Bertelsmann Music Group (later sold to Sony Music). In October 2022, Republic Records announced a worldwide music deal with Nickelodeon.

Music by Nickelodeon Inc.
Music by Nickelodeon Inc. is a separate division of Paramount Global that administers Nickelodeon's music catalog, including the songs used for Nick Records releases. It manages all of the music produced by Nickelodeon for its original shows. The division is affiliated with BMI and was founded in Delaware. Nickelodeon has also established two other publishers for its music: Tunes by Nickelodeon Inc. (affiliated with ASCAP) and Nickelodeon Notes Inc. (affiliated with SESAC).

Artists

Current
Blue's Clues (1999–2006; 2019–present)
SpongeBob SquarePants (2001–present)
JoJo Siwa (2016–present)
Blaze and the Monster Machines (2019-present)
Bubble Guppies (2019–present)
The Loud House (2020–present)
Noggin (2020-present)

Former
 Kel Mitchell (1996–1999)
 Nick Cannon (2001–2003)
 Dora the Explorer (2004–2019)
 Drake Bell (2004–2008)
 Jamie Lynn Spears (2005–2008)
 Emma Roberts (2005)
 Nat and Alex Wolff  (2005–2008)
 Miranda Cosgrove (2007–2012)
 Victoria Justice (2009–2012)
 Keke Palmer (2009–2012)
 Ariana Grande (2010–2012)
 Elizabeth Gillies (2010–2012)
 Rachel Crow (2012)
 Ren and Stimpy by Billy West
 Big Time Rush (2009–2014)

Albums

References

External links
 Official website (archived)

Nickelodeon
Children's record labels
American record labels
Record labels established in 1993
1993 establishments in the United States